{{Automatic_taxobox
| image = Prophantis smaragdina.jpg
| image_caption =  Prophantis smaragdina 
| taxon = Prophantis
| authority = Warren, 1896
| synonyms = 
}}Prophantis ' is a genus of moths of the family Crambidae.

SpeciesProphantis adusta Inoue, 1986 (from  Australia, India, New Guinea, New Hebrides, Philippines, Timor, Taiwan)Prophantis androstigmata (Hampson, 1918) (from Australia and New Guinea)Prophantis coenostolalis (Hampson, 1899) (from Sierra Leone)Prophantis longicornalis (Mabille, 1900) (from Madagascar)Prophantis octoguttalis (C. Felder, R. Felder & Rogenhofer, 1875) (from Indonesia)Prophantis smaragdina (Butler, 1875) (from South Africa)Prophantis triplagalis Warren, 1996 (from India)Prophantis xanthomeralis'' (Hampson, 1918) (from Malawi)

References

Spilomelinae
Crambidae genera
Taxa named by William Warren (entomologist)